Kinder Morgan Interstate Gas Transmission was a natural gas pipeline system that brought gas from the Rocky Mountains into Missouri and Nebraska, where it joined other pipes to go on towards the Midwest.  Prior to being purchased by Kinder Morgan Energy Partners, it was named KN Energy and Kansas Nebraska Pipeline.  Its FERC code is 53.

In 2012, Tallgrass Energy Partners (FERC code 1007) bought this pipeline (See Tallgrass Interstate Gas Transmission).

See also
List of North American natural gas pipelines

References

External links
Kinder Morgan Pipeline Electronic Bulletin Board

Kinder Morgan
Natural gas pipelines in the United States
Energy in Colorado
Energy in Missouri
Energy in Nebraska